Melvinder Kanth is a documentary film-maker and actor who has appeared in several TV films and theatre in the United Kingdom and Singapore since 1996. He appeared in 2008's Kallang Roar the Movie as Captain of the Legendary Singapore national football team of the 1970s. Kanth trained at the Bristol Old Vic Theatre School in England.

Filmography
In Search of the Penan (1999)
In Search of Afghanistan (2001)
1988..Segaris Sinar (2008) ... Mail
Kallang Roar the Movie (2008) .... Samad Allapitchay

References
Movie Exclusive

External links
Youth.SG

1970 births
Living people
Singaporean male actors